Nemes were pieces of striped head cloth worn by pharaohs in ancient Egypt. It covered the whole crown and behind of the head and nape of the neck (sometimes also extending a little way down the back) and had lappets, two large flaps which hung down behind the ears and in front of both shoulders. It was sometimes combined with the double crown, as it is on the statues of Ramesses II at Abu Simbel. The earliest depiction of the nemes, along with a uraeus, is the ivory label of Den from the 1st Dynasty. It is not a crown in itself, but still symbolizes the pharaoh's power.

Modern Recreations 
The occult society "The Hermetic Order of the Golden Dawn" uses an Egyptian nemes, which they spell "nemyss", as part of their "traditional ceremonial garb".

Gallery

Further reading
 Toby A. H. Wilkinson, Early Dynastic Egypt, Routledge 1999
 Bruce Graham Trigger, Ancient Egypt: A Social History, Cambridge University Press 1983
 Fragment of a basalt Egyptian-style statue of Ptolemy I

References

External links

Crowns (headgear)
Headgear
Egyptian artefact types